The Oleacinoidea are a superfamily of air-breathing land snails and slugs, terrestrial gastropod mollusks in the suborder Helicina of the order Stylommatophora.

Taxonomy
The following families, previously categorized within the Testacelloidea, were in 2017 transferred to the superfamily Oleacinoidea H. Adams & A. Adams, 1855
 Oleacinidae H. Adams & A. Adams, 1855
 Spiraxidae H. B. Baker, 1939

References

Stylommatophora
Gastropod superfamilies